Cult Following is the second studio album by American-born, Montreal-based indie rock artist Little Scream (Laurel Sprengelmeyer).  It was released on Merge Records (in the United States) and Dine Alone Records (in Canada) on May 6, 2016.

Background 
Sprengelmeyer's own experiences influenced the direction of Cult Following as she "'grew up in a kind of Christian religious cult' as a Jehovah’s Witness" as well as her visit to a "cult-like group in Brazil". In an interview with Exclaim, Sprengelmeyer described her album as her attempt at making Purple Rain if it was "done by a Midwestern girl with more of a folk upbringing". Although unused on the final cut of the album, three of the songs were mixed by Prince's longtime collaborator, David Z. at Sunset Sound Recorders where Purple Rain was mixed.

On the song "Love as a Weapon", Sprengelmeyer says "I was thinking of classic pop songs, how a good one can lift you out of a fog like nothing else. This is a song of rebellious joy, for dancing and crying and starting over, again and again."

Recording 
The album features Sufjan Stevens, Sharon Van Etten, Aaron Dessner and Bryce Dessner (of The National), Owen Pallett, Kyp Malone (of TV on the Radio), and Mary Margaret O'Hara. Many of the album's collaborations came about through friendships and previous collaborations. Regarding her collaboration with O'Hara, Sprengelmeyer remarked that she was the only person she "really reached out to as a fan".

Richard Reed Parry, of the band Arcade Fire, is credited as Little Scream's creative partner and helped with the music on the album.

Promotion 
The first single, "Love as a Weapon," premiered on February 10, 2016 on Beats 1 Radio with Zane Lowe. The music video for the single premiered on March 22, 2016.

The song "Someone Will Notice" premiered on April 5, 2016. "The Kissing", featuring Kyp Malone of TV on the Radio, was released as a third pre-release single on April 12, 2016.

Track listing

Personnel 

Musicians
 Andrew Barr - drums, vocals
 Brad Barr - guitar, vocals
 Thomas Bartlett - keyboards, piano
 Aaron Dessner - engineer, guitar, synthesizer, bass
 Bryce Dessner - guitar
 Jeremy Gara - drums
 Adam Kinner - saxophone
 Kyp Malone - vocals
 Mary Margaret O'Hara - vocals
 Sarah Pagé - harp
 Owen Pallett - string arrangements, violin
 Marcus Paquin - bass, composer, engineer, guitar, mixing, producer
 Richard Reed Parry - bass, upright bass, composer, drum machine, drums, engineer, guitar, keyboards, percussion, producer, string arrangements
 Andrew Peneycad - vocals
 Parker Shper - piano
 Laurel Sprengelmeyer - art direction, composer, guitar, noise, omnichord, piano, primary artist, synthesizer, vocals
 Lily Sprengelmeyer - composer, vocals, engineer, producer
 Sufjan Stevens - composer, synthesizer
 Sharon Van Etten - vocals
 Mark "Bucky" Wheaton - drums

Production
 Pietro Amato - engineer
 Philip Shaw Bova - mastering
 Hans Bernhard - engineer
 Howard Bilerman - engineer
 Dusdin Condren - cover photo
 Mikel Durlam - art direction, composer
 Maggie Fost - design
 Mark Lawson - engineer
 Joey Kramm - inside photo
 Rusty Santos - mixing
 Tim Vesely - engineer
 Jordy Walker - engineer
 David Z. - mixing

References 

2016 albums